Michele Ansaldi was an Italian automobile engineer, designer, and industrialist. He is known for creating the Ansaldi automobile in Milan in 1904 which became the F.I.A.T. Brevetti, and for co-founding the S.P.A. (Società Piemontese Automobili) in Turin in 1906 which manufactured cars, commercial vehicles, aero engines and military vehicles.

Ansaldi
In 1904 he founded the Ansaldi automobile company in Milan which manufactured a small car with a Fiat 10/12 HP engine. It featured the world's first 'pre-formed' chassis, plus a drive shaft and differential unit with bevelled gears and universal joints.

In 1905 Fiat bought Ansaldi and launched the car as the Fiat-Ansaldi 10-12 HP. In 1906 it was renamed the Fiat Brevetti, and production continued until 1912 with the Fiat Brevetti 2.

S.P.A. (Società Piemontese Automobili)
On 12 June 1906 Matteo Ceirano and Michele Ansaldi founded the S.P.A. (Società Piemontese Automobili) in Turin. It had significant success manufacturing a range of automobiles, military vehicles and aero-engines. Ansaldi left in 1912 (or 1916). It was bought by FIAT in 1926 although it continued manufacturing military and commercial vehicles until 1947 when it was fully merged in FIAT.

See also 
 Ceirano GB & C
 Itala, car manufacturer based in Turin from 1904-1934, started in 1903 by Matteo Ceirano and five partners

References

This article contains some information translated from the French Wikipedia.

External links
Image of 1907 Fiat Brevetti Landualet

Italian automotive pioneers
Fiat